The English cricket team toured India between November 2016 and January 2017 to play five Tests, three One Day Internationals (ODIs) and three Twenty20 International (T20I) matches. The Board of Control for Cricket in India (BCCI) confirmed the dates of the tour in July 2016. India last hosted a five-Test series in 1986–87 against Pakistan.

India agreed to use the Decision Review System (DRS) for this series against England on trial basis to evaluate the improvements made in the system. This was the first time since 2008 that there was a bilateral series involving India with all the components of the review system in place, including "Ultra Edge". However, Hot Spot was not amongst the tools available to be used. DRS was used in the ODI series between the two teams.

The Test series was played for Anthony De Mello Trophy, with India winning the 5-match series 4–0. During the fifth Test of the series, India made their highest total ever in Test cricket, scoring 759 runs for 7 wickets before declaring their innings. India's victory in the fifth Test broke their record for consecutive Tests without defeat, taking their total to eighteen unbeaten matches. They also finished the year with nine Test victories, the most ever for India.

Prior to the naming of the squads for the ODI and T20I matches, MS Dhoni announced that he was standing down as India's limited-overs captain. Virat Kohli was appointed as captain for the ODI and T20I fixtures. Dhoni played in what was planned to be his final match as captain of an Indian team in the first 50-over tour match against England XI on 10 January 2017. However, he would return to the captaincy in September 2018, during the 2018 Asia Cup.

The ODI series was a high scoring series with an aggregate of 2,090 runs being scored, which was the highest number of runs in a series of three or fewer matches. All the innings in the series recorded a score of more than 300. India won the ODI series 2–1 and the T20I series by the same margin. It was the first time that India had won a T20I bilateral series against England.

Squads

James Anderson was added to England's squad after recovering from injury. KL Rahul was added to India's squad for the second Test. Bhuvneshwar Kumar was added to India's squad for the last three Tests, while Gautam Gambhir was dropped. Due to thigh strain Wriddhiman Saha missed the third Test. Parthiv Patel was called up as his replacement. KL Rahul and Hardik Pandya got injured while training in the nets at the PCA Stadium. Pandya was released from the squad, however, Rahul was expected to be fit for the fourth Test. England's Haseeb Hameed injured his hand in the third Test and went home to undergo surgery on it. Keaton Jennings was named as Hameed's replacement and Liam Dawson replaced Zafar Ansari, who injured his back. Ishant Sharma was released from the squad for the fourth Test for his wedding and rejoined the squad for the last Test. Saha also missed the last two Tests as he had not recovered fully from injury. Ajinkya Rahane missed the final two Tests of the series due to a finger injury. He was replaced by Manish Pandey. Shardul Thakur was added to India's squad as cover for Mohammed Shami who had a sore knee. Alex Hales was ruled out of the remaining limited-overs fixtures after he fractured his hand during the second ODI. Jonny Bairstow was named as Hales' replacement for the T20I fixtures. Ahead of the T20I series, India rested Ravichandran Ashwin and Ravindra Jadeja, replacing them with Amit Mishra and Parvez Rasool.

Test series

1st Test

2nd Test

3rd Test

4th Test

5th Test

ODI series

1st ODI

2nd ODI

3rd ODI

T20I series

1st T20I

2nd T20I

3rd T20I

Tour matches

50-over match: India A v England XI

50-over match: India A v England XI

References

External links
 Series home at ESPN Cricinfo

2016 in English cricket
2017 in English cricket
2016 in Indian cricket
2017 in Indian cricket
International cricket competitions in 2016–17
English cricket tours of India